Gloucester City High School is a comprehensive four-year community public high school that is based in Gloucester City, in Camden County, in the U.S. state of New Jersey. The school serves students from seventh through twelfth grade as the lone secondary school of the Gloucester City Public Schools, one of 31 former Abbott districts statewide that were established pursuant to the decision by the New Jersey Supreme Court in Abbott v. Burke which are now referred to as "SDA Districts" based on the requirement for the state to cover all costs for school building and renovation projects in these districts under the supervision of the New Jersey Schools Development Authority.

As of the 2021–22 school year, the school had an enrollment of 624 students and 41.5 classroom teachers (on an FTE basis), for a student–teacher ratio of 15.0:1. There were 283 students (45.4% of enrollment) eligible for free lunch and 47 (7.5% of students) eligible for reduced-cost lunch.

Students from Brooklawn attend the high school for grades 9-12 as part of a sending/receiving relationship.

History
A new high school facility, completed at a cost of almost $2 million (equivalent to $ million in ) was opened to students in February 1961.

Awards, recognition and rankings
The school was the 270th-ranked public high school in New Jersey out of 339 schools statewide in New Jersey Monthly magazine's September 2014 cover story on the state's "Top Public High Schools", using a new ranking methodology. The school had been ranked 179th in the state of 328 schools in 2012, after being ranked 194th in 2010 out of 322 schools listed. The magazine ranked the school 190th in 2008 out of 316 schools. The school was ranked 247th in the magazine's September 2006 issue, which surveyed 316 schools across the state.

Athletics
The Gloucester City High School Lions compete as a member school in the Colonial Conference, which is comprised of public high schools in Camden and Gloucester counties, and operates under the supervision of the New Jersey State Interscholastic Athletic Association (NJSIAA). The school had been a member of the Tri-County Conference since it was established in 1928, and joined the Colonial Conference for the 2020-21 school year. With 480 students in grades 10-12, the school was classified by the NJSIAA for the 2022–24 school years as Group II South for most athletic competition purposes. The football team competes in the Colonial Division of the 94-team West Jersey Football League superconference and was classified as Group II South for football for 2022–2024.

Girls' championships include:
1996 Field hockey South Jersey Group I champion
1999 Cross country South Jersey Group I champion
1999 Field hockey Tri-County and South Jersey Group I champion
2000 Field hockey Tri-County and South Jersey Group I champion
2000 Softball Tri-County and Group I state champion (defeating Saddle Brook High/Middle School)
2001 Cross Country South Jersey Group I champion
2001 Softball Group I state champion (defeating Emerson Jr./Sr. High School by a score of 11-4 in the finals)
2002 Field Hockey South Jersey Group I champion
2003 Cross Country Tri-County, South Jersey and Group I state champion
2004 Cross country Tri-County and South Jersey Group I champion
2004 Field hockey Tri-County and South Jersey Group I champion
2005 Softball Group I state champion (vs. Verona High School in the final)
2007 Softball Tri-County and South Jersey Group I champion
2009 Basketball Tri-County and South Jersey Group I champion
2009 Softball Tri-County, South Jersey and Group I state champion with a 3-0 win vs. Saddle Brook High School
2014 Bowling Tri-County, South Jersey Group I champion

Boys' championships include:
1967 Basketball Group II state champion with a 70-47 win vs. Shore Regional High School in the school's first final, to finish the season with a record of 25-1
1971 Baseball Group I state champion vs. Hackettstown High School
1998 Baseball Tri-County champion
1998 Basketball Tri-County champion
1998 Football Tri-County champion
1999 Baseball Tri-County champion
2000 Bowling Olympic Conference champion
2001 Bowling Olympic Conference National Division champion
2002 Football Tri-County champion
2004 Baseball Tri-County champion
2012 Football Tri-County champion

Administration
The school's principal is Dr. Jennifer Holmstrom. Her administration team includes two assistant principals.

Notable alumni
 Edward Durr (born 1963), politician and truck driver who has represented the 3rd Legislative district in the New Jersey Senate since 2022.

References

External links 
 
Gloucester City Public Schools

School Data for the Gloucester City Public Schools, National Center for Education Statistics
South Jersey Sports: Gloucester HS

Gloucester City, New Jersey
Public high schools in Camden County, New Jersey
Public middle schools in New Jersey